Judge Camp may refer to:

Jack Tarpley Camp Jr. (born 1943), judge of the United States District Court for the Northern District of Georgia
Laurie Smith Camp (1953–2020), judge of the United States District Court for the District of Nebraska